Pájaros Island Biological Reserve, is a protected area in Costa Rica, managed under the Central Pacific Conservation Area, it was created in 1976 by decree 5963-A.

Pájaros Island lies 500 meters off the coast of the gulf basin, and has a very hot and dry climate. The plant species that grow on the islet are deciduous and semi-deciduous, such as the wild guava and fig trees.

References 

Nature reserves in Costa Rica
Protected areas established in 1976